Daniel Johnston (1961–2019) was an American singer.

Daniel or Dan Johnston may also refer to:
Daniel Johnston (North Dakota politician), member of North Dakota House of Representatives
Daniel Johnston (scientist) (born 1948), American neuroscientist
Dan Johnston (politician) (1938–2016), American lawyer and politician
Danny Johnston, member of American band Doggy Style
Mrs Daniel Johnston, sponsor of USNS Mission Los Angeles

See also
Daniel Johnson (disambiguation)
Dan Johnson (disambiguation)